Bettencourt-Saint-Ouen is a commune in the Somme department and Hauts-de-France region of northern France.

Geography

Population

See also
Communes of the Somme department

References

Communes of Somme (department)